The Best of the Beta Band - Music and The Best of the Beta Band - Film are retrospective best of collections by The Beta Band, on CD and DVD respectively, released on 3 October 2005. The cover artwork combines elements from the covers of each of the three EPs and three albums released by the band in its seven-year lifespan.

Music track listing

CD one
The best of the studio recordings, as selected by the band
 "Dry the Rain"
 "Inner Meet Me"
 "She’s the One"
 "Dr. Baker"
 "It’s Not Too Beautiful"
 "Smiling" (edit)
 "To You Alone"
 "Squares"
 "Human Being" (radio edit)
 "Gone"
 "Broke" (radio edit)
 "Assessment" (radio edit)
 "Easy"
 "Wonderful"
 "Troubles"
 "Simple"

CD two
Live at Shepherd's Bush Empire, 30 November 2004
 "Squares"
 "It’s Not Too Beautiful"
 "Inner Meet Me"
 "Simple"
 "She’s the One"
 "Easy"
 "Dr. Baker"
 "Dry the Rain"
 "Quiet"
 "Broke"
 "Assessment"
 "Dogs Got a Bone"
 "The House Song"

Film

Trailers
 "Chalk and Cheese"
 Directed by John Maclean
 "King Rib"
 Directed by Pete Rankin, Steve Mason
 "Highland Fidelity"
 Directed by John Maclean
 "Old Jock Radio"
 Directed by Pete Rankin

Videos
 "Inner Meet Me"
 Directed by John Maclean
 "Los Amigos Del Beta Bandidos"
 Directed by The Beta Band
 "Dance O'er The Border"
 Directed by John Maclean
 "Smiling"
 Directed by Mark Szaszy and Corinne Day
 "Brokenupadingdong"
 Directed by Josh Eve
 "Squares"
 Directed by John Maclean
 "Al Sharp"
 Directed by John Maclean
 "Assessment"
 Directed by John Maclean and Robin Jones
 "Lion Thief"
 Directed by Andrew Cranston
 "Wonderful"
 Directed by Nina Chakrabarti
 "Trouble"
 Directed by John Maclean
 "Out-Side"
 Directed by Robin Jones and John Maclean
 "Rhododendron"
 Created by Robin Jones
 "Country Bird"
 Directed by Steve Mason and Pete Rankin
 "Simple"
 By Andrew Keller
 "Weirds Way"
 Directed by Steve Mason and Pete Rankin
 "Remote Troubles"
 Directed by John Maclean and Robin Jones

Documentaries
 The Depot To Monte Cristo
 Directed by Sam Tyler
 1997–2004
 Directed by John Maclean
 Let It Beta
 Directed by Pete Rankin

Live at the Shepherd's Bush Empire
Live at Shepherd's Bush Empire, 29 November 2004
 "Inner Meet Me"
 "Dry the Rain"
 "Broke"
 "Assessment"

References

External links 
 

The Beta Band albums
The Beta Band video albums
Documentary films about musical groups
2005 greatest hits albums
Live video albums
2005 live albums
2005 video albums
Music video compilation albums
2000s English-language films